Varnamkhast (also Romanized as Varnāmkhāst and Varnāmkhvāst) is a city in the Central District of Lenjan County, Isfahan Province, Iran. At the 2006 census, its population was 15,294, in 3,845 families.

References

Populated places in Lenjan County

Cities in Isfahan Province